Warme (also: Warmebach) is a river of Hesse, Germany. It is approximately 33.1 km long. It flows into the Diemel near Liebenau.

See also
List of rivers of Hesse

References

Rivers of Hesse
Rivers of Germany